This page is a listing of major Beretta Mini Pistols variants from around the world.

Below is the list of Beretta Mini Pistols.

Table of Beretta Mini Pistols

Beretta pistols